Angel Manuel Soto (born January 28, 1983) is a Puerto Rican film director, producer, and screenwriter.

Early life

Angel Manuel Soto was born in Santurce, a neighborhood in San Juan, Puerto Rico. His parents were a car salesman and a flight attendant. During his youth, Soto was involved in soccer and boxing, which inspired some of his later projects. As he grew up, he studied architecture and documentary filmmaking and writing. Soto began his career as a TV producer and later worked on Art Direction at a local advertising agency.

Career

Before working on his first short film, Soto worked at Standard Style Boutique in Kansas City. During that time, he rented all the rooms in his house and slept on the floor for 2 months in order to save money. In 2009, Soto released the short film 22weeks, which ended up winning multiple awards, including the Bronze Telly Award in 2010. After that, he has released a variety of short films, documentary shorts, and feature films, including La Granja and El Púgil. Both of these films were nominated to various film awards at film festivals, including the Chicago Latino Film Festival, the Miami Film Festival, and the Tribeca Film Festival.

In 2018, it was announced that Soto would direct Charm City Kings, a film based on the 2013 documentary 12 O'Clock Boys. The film had its world premiere at the Sundance Film Festival on January 27, 2020, where it ended up winning special jury prize for its ensemble. The film was scheduled to be released on April 10, 2020, by Sony Pictures Classics, but was rescheduled to August 14, 2020, due to the COVID-19 pandemic. In May 2020, it was announced HBO Max had acquired distribution rights to the film. It was released on October 8, 2020.

In February 2021, Soto was announced as the director of an upcoming film about the Blue Beetle for DC Films and Warner Bros. The superhero's alter-ego is a Mexican-American teenager called Jaime Reyes, which would make it the first DC film to feature a Latino superhero as the lead. The film is set to be written by Mexican-born writer Gareth Dunnet-Alcocer. In March 2021, it was announced that Soto would also direct an upcoming Transformers film, along with screenwriter Marco Ramirez.

Filmography

Short films

Feature films

References

External links

1983 births
Living people
Puerto Rican film directors
People from Santurce, Puerto Rico